Freddy Carol Sandoval Herrera (born August 16, 1982) is a Mexican former professional baseball third baseman.

Sandoval played his collegiate baseball for the San Diego Toreros from 2002–2004, and was part of two conference championship teams during his career there.

Sandoval made his major league debut for the Los Angeles Angels of Anaheim against the New York Yankees on September 8, at Angel Stadium in Anaheim, California. He Played in the 2009 World Baseball Classic as Mexico's leadoff hitter.

Sandoval was named the Mental Skills Coach by Kansas City Royals after retiring. In 2017, he served as a coach/team psychologist for the Toros de Tijuana of the Mexican Baseball League.

References

External links

1982 births
2009 World Baseball Classic players
Arizona League Angels players
Arkansas Travelers players
Baseball players from Baja California
Cedar Rapids Kernels players
Living people
Los Angeles Angels players
Major League Baseball players from Mexico
Major League Baseball third basemen
Mexican expatriate baseball players in the United States
Sportspeople from Tijuana
Rancho Cucamonga Quakes players
Salt Lake Bees players
San Diego Toreros baseball players
Somerset Patriots players